Peggy Flanagan (born September 22, 1979) is an American politician, community organizer, and Native American activist serving as the 50th lieutenant governor of Minnesota since 2019. A member of the Minnesota Democratic–Farmer–Labor Party (DFL), Flanagan served in the Minnesota House of Representatives from 2015 to 2019. She is a member of the White Earth Nation and is the first Native American and woman of color to hold statewide office in Minnesota.

Flanagan grew up in Saint Louis Park, Minnesota, an inner-ring suburb of Minneapolis. She attended the University of Minnesota. Flanagan was previously involved in organizing the urban indigenous community, including for U.S. Senator Paul Wellstone’s 2002 reelection campaign. After serving one term on the Minneapolis Public Schools Board, she was a member of Wellstone Action, a training organization for progressive candidates. In 2015, Flanagan was elected to the state house to fill a vacancy and represented a section of Minneapolis's western, inner-ring suburbs. At the 2016 Democratic National Convention, she spoke on Native American representation in politics. 

Flanagan was elected lieutenant governor in 2018 and reelected in 2022, both times as Tim Walz's running mate. She has advocated for working-class families in addition to indigenous communities.

Early life and education
The daughter of American Indian land rights and sovereignty activist Marvin Manypenny, Flanagan was raised by a single mother, a phlebotomist, in St. Louis Park, Minnesota. She is a citizen of the White Earth Nation. Flanagan received a bachelor's degree in child psychology and American Indian Studies from the University of Minnesota in 2002.

Career

Early career 
While in college, Flanagan worked on U.S. Senator Paul Wellstone's campaign, eventually becoming an organizer for the urban Native American community. After college, she worked for the Minnesota Council of Churches, performing outreach work between Native American families and the Minneapolis public school system.

In her first run for elective office, Flanagan won a seat on the board of Minneapolis Public Schools in 2004. In a six-candidate field that featured two incumbents, the political newcomer Flanagan garnered the most votes. She was elected along with Lydia Lee and incumbent Sharon Henry-Blythe and served one term on the board, from 2005 to 2009. In 2008, she challenged incumbent Minnesota Representative Joe Mullery in the Democratic primary, but dropped out of the race due to her mother's health problems. After working a handful of other jobs, Flanagan joined Wellstone Action as a trainer of activists, organizers, and candidates. She was then appointed to briefly serve on the school board again from 2010 until 2011. As executive director of Children's Defense Fund-Minnesota, she also advocated for the successful 2014 effort to raise Minnesota's minimum wage. In 2016, she began training for The Management Center, helping social justice leaders build and run effective, equitable, and sustainable organizations.

Minnesota House of Representatives
Flanagan was elected to the Minnesota House of Representatives unopposed in a special election on November 3, 2015, and sworn in on November 9. Susan Allen (Rosebud) and Republican Steve Green (White Earth Ojibwe) were the only other Natives in the Minnesota State House at that time.

Three other Native women sought election to the Minnesota legislature in November 2016: Mary Kelly Kunesh-Podein (Standing Rock Lakota) and Jamie Becker-Finn (Leech Lake Band of Ojibwe) ran for state representative seats and Chilah Brown (Mille Lacs Band of Ojibwe) ran for the Minnesota Senate. Kunesh-Podein and Becker-Finn were elected to the Minnesota House of Representatives and took office in January 2017.

In 2017, Flanagan, Allen, Kunesh-Podein and Beck-Finn formed the Minnesota House Native American Caucus to represent issues of both urban and rural Native Americans and their other constituents.

2016 Democratic National Convention
Flanagan was invited to address the 2016 Democratic National Convention on July 28, 2016. She was the second Native American woman to address the DNC after Denise Juneau did so in 2012.

Lieutenant governor of Minnesota

Elections 
In 2017, Flanagan became a candidate for lieutenant governor, joining U.S. Representative Tim Walz, who won the DFL primary in the 2018 Minnesota gubernatorial election. In the general election, Walz and Flanagan defeated the Republican nominees, Jeff Johnson and Donna Bergstrom. With their victory, she became the first racial minority woman elected to statewide office in Minnesota and the highest-ranking Native American woman in statewide elected office. Walz and Flanagan were reelected in 2022.

Awards 
In February 2020, the National Congress of American Indians gave Flanagan the Native American Leadership Award for her work raising awareness of Native issues and improving lives of Indigenous people.

Bemidji State University named her a Distinguished Minnesotan in 2020.

In July 2020, Flanagan received the Dr. B. Robert Lewis Award from the Minnesota Public Health Association for her work on addressing inequities in public health.

Personal life
Flanagan has a daughter with her former husband, Tim Hellendrung. The marriage ended in 2017. She resides in St. Louis Park, Minnesota.

On January 12, 2018, Flanagan announced on her personal Facebook page that she was in a relationship with the Minnesota Public Radio News host Tom Weber; MPR News announced that day that it was reassigning Weber to no longer cover "the governor’s race, the Legislature, potential legislation, public policy involving the executive or legislative branches or any topic related to the November 2018 election." Flanagan married Weber in September 2019.

Electoral history

See also 
 List of minority governors and lieutenant governors in the United States

References

External links

Government website
 Campaign website

1979 births
21st-century American politicians
21st-century American women politicians
Lieutenant Governors of Minnesota
Living people
Democratic Party members of the Minnesota House of Representatives
Native American state legislators in Minnesota
Native American women in politics
Ojibwe people
People from St. Louis Park, Minnesota
School board members in Minnesota
University of Minnesota College of Liberal Arts alumni
Women state legislators in Minnesota
20th-century Native American women
20th-century Native Americans
21st-century Native American women
21st-century Native Americans